This is a list of Norwegian television related events from 2016.

Events
3 June - Marius Samuelsen wins the ninth series of Idol, becoming the first male singer since Kjartan Salvesen in the second series to beat a female singer to win the show.

Television shows

2000s
Idol (2003-2007, 2011–present)
Skal vi danse? (2006–present)
Norske Talenter (2008–present)

2010s
The Voice – Norges beste stemme (2012–present)

See also
2016 in Norway